David Neil Whalley (born 29 October 1965) is an English former professional footballer who played as a midfielder. Although most of his career was played in non-league football, he played 50 matches in the Football League for Preston North End.

His son Shaun also played in the Football League for Accrington Stanley. Now plays for Shrewsbury Town as a winger

References

1965 births
Living people
English footballers
Footballers from Liverpool
Association football midfielders
Warrington Town F.C. players
Preston North End F.C. players
Altrincham F.C. players
Runcorn F.C. Halton players
Droylsden F.C. players
English Football League players